St. Vital is a provincial electoral division in the Canadian province of Manitoba.

Historical riding
The original St. Vital riding was established at the time of the province's creation in 1870, as one of twelve "francophone" constituencies.  It was eliminated in 1879, after a redistribution process which reduced the level of francophone representation in the province.

List of provincial representatives

Current riding
The modern St. Vital riding was created by redistribution in 1957, and has formally existed since the provincial election of 1958. The riding is located in the southeastern section of the City of Winnipeg.

St. Vital was bordered to the east by St. Boniface and Southdale, to the south by Riel, to the north by St. Boniface and to the west by Riel, Lord Roberts and Fort Garry (the latter two across the Red River of the North). As of the 2019 Manitoba election, it is bordered to the north by St. Boniface, to the east by Southdale, to the southeast by Lagimodière, to the south by Riel, to the west by Fort Garry, and to the northwest by Fort Rouge (the latter two across the Red River).

The riding's population in 1996 was 20,255. Its character is mostly middle-class, although 28% of the riding's residents are categorized as low-income. In 1999, the average family income was $44,868, and the unemployment rate was 7.90%. Ten per cent of the riding's residents are francophone, and 7% are aboriginal. Almost half the riding's dwellings are rental units.

The service sector accounts for 16% of St. Vital's industry, with a further 13% in the retail trade.

St. Vital was represented by members of the Progressive Conservative Party from 1958 to 1971. Since then, it has generally been represented by members of the New Democratic Party (NDP), although the Liberals held the seat for one term from 1988 to 1990, and the Progressive Conservatives for two terms from 1990 to 1999.

List of provincial representatives

Electoral results

1870 general election

1874 general election

1878 general election

1958 general election

1959 general election

1962 general election

1966 general election

1969 general election

1971 by-election

1973 general election

1977 general election

1981 general election

1986 general election

1988 general election

1990 general election

1995 general election

1999 general election

2003 general election

2007 general election

2011 general election

2016 general election

2019 general election

Previous boundaries

References

Manitoba provincial electoral districts
Politics of Winnipeg
1870 establishments in Manitoba
1957 establishments in Manitoba
1879 disestablishments in Manitoba